Operation Beatbox is a various artists compilation album released on September 17, 1996 by Re-Constriction Records. The album compiles covers of popular hip hop tracks performed by electro-industrial acts, many of whom were part of the Re-Constriction roster. It served as a direct sequel to the similarly themed cover album compilation Shut Up Kitty, released in 1993.

Reception
Alternative Press gave the album high praises, awarding it five out of five stars and saying "there's no doubt that when it comes to rewriting rap's classic moments, industrial/goth bands say more for the cultural links between the two black sheep of modern musical culture than one might have dreamed." Aiding & Abetting gave it a more mixed review, saying the material ranges "from the sublime (SMP thrashing out "Prophets of Rage") to the utterly silly (as any cover of "Gangsta's Paradise" was bound to be)." Sonic Boom found the compilation's absurdity to be part of its charm, saying "don't be surprised if you find the majority of these tracks more than amusing as there is something fundamentally wrong with a gang of privileged white kids trying to sound like a band of inner city black youths."

Track listing

Accolades

Personnel
Adapted from the Operation Beatbox liner notes.
 Chase – compiling
 Scan, Boy! – cover art
 Steven Seibold – mastering

Release history

References

External links 
 

1996 compilation albums
Alternative rock compilation albums
Industrial rock compilation albums
Re-Constriction Records compilation albums